Hillsboro is a city in Marion County, Kansas, United States.  Hillsboro was named after John Gillespie Hill, who homesteaded in the area in 1871.  As of the 2020 census, the population of the city was 2,732.  Hillsboro is home of Tabor College, which had 766 students enrolled in Fall 2014.

History

Early history

For many millennia, the Great Plains of North America was inhabited by nomadic Native Americans.  From the 16th century to 18th century, the Kingdom of France claimed ownership of large parts of North America.  In 1762, after the French and Indian War, France secretly ceded New France to Spain, per the Treaty of Fontainebleau.

19th century
In 1802, Spain returned most of the land to France.  In 1803, most of the land for modern day Kansas was acquired by the United States from France as part of the 828,000 square mile Louisiana Purchase for 2.83 cents per acre.

In 1854, the Kansas Territory was organized, then in 1861 Kansas became the 34th U.S. state.  In 1855, Marion County was established within the Kansas Territory, which included the land for modern day Hillsboro.

Hillsboro was named after John Gillespie Hill, who homesteaded in the area in 1871. Originally Hill City was the city name; since another city in Kansas already bore that name, it was changed to Hillsboro on June 20, 1879.  A post office was established in Risley on April 10, 1873 then moved to Hillsboro on August 29, 1879.

As early as 1875, city leaders of Marion held a meeting to consider a branch railroad from Florence.  In 1878, Atchison, Topeka and Santa Fe Railway and parties from Marion County and McPherson County chartered the Marion and McPherson Railway Company.  In 1879, a branch line was built from Florence to McPherson, in 1880 it was extended to Lyons, in 1881 it was extended to Ellinwood.  The line was leased and operated by the Atchison, Topeka and Santa Fe Railway. The line from Florence to Marion, was abandoned in 1968.  In 1992, the line from Marion to McPherson was sold to Central Kansas Railway. In 1993, after heavy flood damage, the line from Marion through Hillsboro to McPherson was abandoned and removed. The original branch line connected Florence, Marion, Canada, Hillsboro, Lehigh, Canton, Galva, McPherson, Conway, Windom, Little River, Mitchell, Lyons, Chase, Ellinwood.

20th century
In 1908, Tabor College was founded by members of the Mennonite Brethren and Krimmer Mennonite Brethren Christian churches.

The National Old Trails Road, also known as the Ocean-to-Ocean Highway, was established in 1912, and was routed through Lehigh, Hillsboro, Marion, Lost Springs.

Geography
Hillsboro is located at coordinates 38.3519556, -97.2044723 in the Flint Hills and Great Plains of the state of Kansas.

Climate
The climate in this area is characterized by hot, humid summers and generally mild to cool winters.  According to the Köppen Climate Classification system, Hillsboro has a humid subtropical climate, abbreviated "Cfa" on climate maps.

Area events
 Hillsboro Arts & Crafts Fair
 Hillsboro Farmer's Market
 Marion County Fair
 Annual Easter egg hunt

Area attractions

Hillsboro has two buildings listed on the National Register of Historic Places (NRHP).
 W.F. Schaeffler House Museum (NRHP), 312 East Grand Ave.
 Mennonite Settlement Museums, 501 South Ash Street. Main museum on Memorial Drive (1 block west).
 1876 P.P. Loewen House (NRHP). Previously known as the Pioneer Adobe House. A traditional Russian clay brick house from the Mennonite settlement village of Hoffnungsthal. The last remaining house of its kind in North America.
 Jacob Friesen Flouring Wind Mill is a detailed replica of the 1876 mill that stood in the Mennonite settlement village of Gnadenau.
 1886 Kreutziger School No. 97 was in service from 1886 to 1960 approximately 5 miles north of Canada, Kansas.
 Marion Reservoir, north-east of Hillsboro, exits closest to farther from Hillsboro along US-56: French Creek cove (Limestone Road), Hillsboro cove (Nighthawk Road), Overlook and Dam (Old Mill Road), Marion cove and Cottonwood Point cove (Pawnee Road).

Demographics

2010 census
As of the census of 2010, there were 2,993 people, 1,071 households, and 684 families residing in the city. The racial makeup of the city was 94.6% White, 1.7% African American, 0.3% Native American, 0.2% Asian, 0.1% Pacific Islander, 0.9% from other races, and 2.1% from two or more races. Hispanic or Latino of any race were 3.2% of the population.

There were 1,071 households, of which 28.7% had children under the age of 18 living with them, 54.6% were married couples living together, 6.3% had a female householder with no husband present, 3.0% had a male householder with no wife present, and 36.1% were non-families. 31.8% of all households were made up of individuals, and 15.8% had someone living alone who was 65 years of age or older. The average household size was 2.31 and the average family size was 2.86.

The median age in the city was 36.2 years. 19.8% of residents were under the age of 18; 20.2% were between the ages of 18 and 24; 17.7% were from 25 to 44; 21.5% were from 45 to 64; and 20.8% were 65 years of age or older. The gender makeup of the city was 48.7% male and 51.3% female.

2000 census
As of the census of 2000, there were 2,854 people, 1,086 households, and 710 families residing in the city. The racial makeup of the city was 97.48% White, 0.35% African American, 0.35% Native American, 0.32% Asian, 0.56% from other races, and 0.95% from two or more races. Hispanic or Latino of any race were 1.51% of the population.

There were 1,086 households, out of which 27.0% had children under the age of 18 living with them, 57.1% were married couples living together, 6.1% had a female householder with no husband present, and 34.6% were non-families. 32.0% of all households were made up of individuals, and 17.4% had someone living alone who was 65 years of age or older. The average household size was 2.25 and the average family size was 2.85.

In the city, the population was spread out, with 20.4% under the age of 18, 17.3% from 18 to 24, 21.9% from 25 to 44, 17.1% from 45 to 64, and 23.3% who were 65 years of age or older. The median age was 38 years. For every 100 females, there were 92.3 males. For every 100 females age 18 and over, there were 89.4 males.

As of 2000 the median income for a household in the city was $32,736, and the median income for a family was $42,465. Males had a median income of $31,188 versus $20,134 for females. The per capita income for the city was $15,544. About 5.5% of families and 9.7% of the population were below the poverty line, including 15.1% of those under age 18 and 6.8% of those age 65 or over.

Economy
The largest employers in Hillsboro are education related, Tabor College and Unified School District 410, which have been in the community for over 100 years.  Manufacturer Hillsboro Industries started business in 1968.  In September 2014, Wal-Mart announced plans to build a Walmart Neighborhood Market store in Hillsboro and will open in spring 2015. There is also employment found in the agricultural sector, with Circle D Manufacturing, Hillsboro Industries, Ag Service, Cooperative Grain and Supply, and Country Side Feed. Hillsboro is also the home to Stone Creek Spas, the only hot tubs built in the state of Kansas.

Government
The Hillsboro government consists of a mayor and four council members.  The council meets the 1st and 3rd Tuesday of each month at 4PM.
 City Hall, 118 E Grand Ave.

Education

College
Tabor College, a private college affiliated with the Mennonite Brethren Church, is located in Hillsboro at 400 South Jefferson Street.  In 2009, Tabor College built a new football complex that is shared with Hillsboro High School.

Primary and secondary education
The community is served by Hillsboro USD 410 public school district.  The high school is a member of T.E.E.N., a shared video teaching network between five area high schools. 
 Hillsboro High School
 Hillsboro Middle School
 Hillsboro Elementary School

Sports
The Hillsboro High School mascot is a Trojan. All high school athletic and non-athletic competition is overseen by the Kansas State High School Activities Association. For 2010/2011 seasons, the football team competes as Class 3A.

Past Championships:
 The Hillsboro High School girls basketball team won the 3A Kansas State Basketball tournament in 2007 for the first time since 1996.

Private Schools
 Hope Valley Christian School, Private Grade School, 1808 Holly Rd, approximately 0.5 mile southwest of Hillsboro.

Library
Each USD 410 school has a library for student access.

Students of Tabor College have access to the Tabor College Library at 400 South Jefferson Street.

The city is served by the Hillsboro Public Library at 120 East Grand Avenue. The library is a member of the North Central Kansas Libraries System.

Media

Print
The community is served by two weekly newspapers, the Hillsboro Free Press.  and the Hillsboro Star-Journal.  The Star-Journal is Hillsboro's oldest publication and the city's official newspaper, with the city's largest paid circulation.  The Free Press is distributed free by carrier to residences in the city, and covers news for the greater Marion County area.

The Wichita Eagle in Wichita delivers to Marion County on Sundays and Thanksgiving. The Salina Journal from Salina offers daily delivery yeararound.

Radio
Hillsboro is served by numerous radio stations of the Wichita-Hutchinson listening market area, and satellite radio.  See Media in Wichita, Kansas.

Television
Hillsboro is served by over-the-air ATSC digital TV of the Wichita-Hutchinson viewing market area, cable TV, and satellite TV.  See Media in Wichita, Kansas.

Infrastructure

Transportation

Utilities
 Internet
 Fiber is provided by TCW.
 DSL is provided by CenturyLink.
 Cable is provided by Eagle Communications.
 Wireless is provided by Pixius Communications, Rise Broadband.
 Satellite is provided by HughesNet, StarBand, WildBlue.
 TV
 Cable is provided by Eagle Communications.
 Satellite is provided by DirecTV, Dish Network.
 Terrestrial is provided by regional digital TV stations.
 Electricity
 City is provided by Kansas Power Pool, billed by City of Hillsboro.
 Rural is provided by Flint Hills RECA.
 Gas is provided by Atmos Energy.
 Water
 City is provided by City of Hillsboro.
 Rural is provided by Marion County RWD #4 (map).
 Sewer 
 Service is provided by City of Hillsboro.
 Trash
 Service is provided by City of Hillsboro.

Notable people

 Donald Dahl (1945-2014), Kansas House of Representatives from 1997 to 2008, U.S. Navy
 J. V. Friesen, Kansas House of Representatives in 1941, furniture dealer
 William Kopper, Kansas House of Representatives in 1935, merchant
 Theodore Schellenberg (1903-1970), archivist and archival theorist.

See also
 Hillsboro High School
 Tabor College and Tabor Bluejays
 Joel Wiens Stadium
 National Register of Historic Places listings in Marion County, Kansas
 Historical Maps of Marion County, Kansas
 Miss Kansas, 1969
 National Old Trails Road
 Threshing Stone
 Gnadenau, Kansas

References

Further reading

 Hillsboro, City on the Prairie; Raymond F Wiebe, Multi Business Press; 1985.
 The Centennial Celebration of Hillsboro - May 18–27, 1984; Hillsboro Centennial Committee; Baker Brothers Printing; May 1984.
 Hillsboro Diamond Jubilee. Glimpses of Our Heritage, June 8–10, 1959; 1959.
 A Guide to Hillsboro, Kansas; Mennonite Brethren Publishing House; 1940.
 Sixtieth Anniversary of the Johannestal Mennonite Church, 1882-1942, Johannestal Mennonite Church; 1942.
 The Story of Gnadenau and Its First Elder, Marion County Kansas, David V Wiebe; Mennonite Brethren Publishing House; 1967.

External links

City
 
 Hillsboro - Directory of Public Officials, League of Kansas Municipalities
Historical
 Historic Images of Hillsboro, Special Photo Collections at Wichita State University Library.
 Marion County cemetery list, archive of KsGenWeb
 Marion County history bibliography,  Marion County school bibliography, Kansas Historical Society
Maps
 Hillsboro city map, KDOT
 Topo Map of Hillsboro area, USGS

Cities in Kansas
Cities in Marion County, Kansas
Mennonitism in Kansas
German-Russian culture in Kansas
Populated places established in 1879
1879 establishments in Kansas
Russian Mennonite diaspora in the United States